Vilborg Davíðsdóttir (born 3 September 1965 in Þingeyri) is an Icelandic writer and journalist. She lives in Reykjavík.

Vilborg has a diploma in journalism, and a BA in English and Ethnology. She wrote her MA thesis in Ethnology about oral tradition and storytelling. 

Her novels The Well of Fates (1993) and The Witches' Judgement (1994) concern a slave in the Viking era and are influenced by the Icelandic sagas. She has also written a trilogy, historical fiction about Auður Djúpúðga (Aud the Deep-Minded), one of Iceland's most famous female settlers.
Vilborg's book Ástin, drekinn og dauðinn (On Love, Dragons and Dying) (2015) is her most personal story yet. There she writes the story of her husband's journey with terminal brain cancer, and her first year as a widow, during which both her mother-in-law and her father died as well.

Some of her books have been translated and published in The United States, Egypt, Germany and Faroe Islands.

Works 
Blóðug jörð (2017)
Ástin, drekinn og dauðinn (2015)
Vígroði (2012)
Auður (2009)
Hrafninn (2005)
Felustaðurinn (2002)
Korku saga - Við Urðarbrunn og Nornadómur (2001)
Galdur (2000)
Eldfórnin (1997) (The Sacrifice)
Nornadómur (1994) (The Witches' Judgement)
Við Urðarbrunn (1993) (The Well of Fates)

External links
Site on Icelandic writers

Vilborg's website

Interview with Vilborg, by Icelandic Literature Center

Podcast interview by composer Linda Buckley and producer Helen Shaw

Icelandic women novelists
Icelandic journalists
Davidsdottir, Vilborg
Davidsdottir, Vilborg
20th-century Icelandic women writers
20th-century Icelandic novelists
21st-century Icelandic women writers
21st-century Icelandic novelists